Kobryn castles were a complex of wooden defense and administrative structures that existed in the city of Kobryn in the 16th–18th centuries. Presumably, the first Kobryn castle (detinets) was founded in the 11th century by the heirs of the Kiev prince Izyaslav on the island at the confluence of the Kobrinka and Mukhavets rivers. The remaining earth embankments were dismantled in the 1880s when laying the Moscow–Warsaw chaussee.

Characteristics
The appearance of castles and their equipment can be established basing on their 16th century inventories. The fortifications consisted of the Lower Castle ("hillock") Castle and the Upper (High) Castle. The entrance to the Lower Castle was blocked by Kobrinka River. A bridge was built across the river, the last span of which was lifting. On both sides the bridge ended with  gate towers. The Lower Castle was protected by 5 towers,  and a parkan. In one of the towers there was a mill.

The Upper Castle was separated from the Lower by a moat. The bridge over the moat rested against the tower-gate of the Upper Castle. The last span of the bridge was also lifted. In the Upper Castle there were also 5 towers (with gates), gorodnyas and parkan. On them there were platforms with eaves covered with shingles. All the towers were covered with shingles.

According to the inventory of 1597, the castle's artillery consisted of 2 cannons and 5 . Of small arms there were 16 , 17 hand cannons and 2 cues.

References

Sources
 
 

Castles in Belarus
Castles of the Grand Duchy of Lithuania
Former castles in Belarus